This is a list of members of the Victorian Legislative Council from the elections of 31 August 1888 to the elections of 11 September 1890.

In 1888 there were fourteen Provinces, each returning three members for a total of 42 members. However, there were additional elections in 1889 to increase by six the number of members in the Council. 

Note the "Term in Office" refers to that members term(s) in the Council, not necessarily for that Province.

James MacBain was President of the Council, Frank Dobson was Chairman of Committees.

  Elected in the additional elections of 1889.

 Cumming resigned November 1888, replaced by Agar Wynne, sworn-in November 1888.
 Lorimer died 6 September 1889; replaced by Benjamin Benjamin in 1889.
 Ormond died 5 May 1889; replaced  by Donald Wallace, sworn-in July 1889.
 Simpson resigned June 1889; replaced by Frederick Illingworth, sworn-in July 1889.
 Sterry resigned March 1889; replaced by Joseph Henry Abbott, sworn-in April 1889.
 Turner's election was declared void in October 1888, replaced by James Stewart Butters, sworn-in December 1888.

References

 Re-member (a database of all Victorian MPs since 1851). Parliament of Victoria.

Members of the Parliament of Victoria by term
19th-century Australian politicians